Active cavity radiometer is an electrically self-calibrating, cavity pyrheliometer used to measure total and spectral solar irradiance.

See also
 Radiometry
Radiation

References

Meteorological instrumentation and equipment
Radiometry